Eulogio Despujol y Dusay (Catalan: Eulogi Despujol i Dusay; 11 March 1834 – 18 October 1907) served as the Spanish Governor-General of the Philippines between 1891 and 1893. 

Alfonso XII granted him the nobiliary title of Count of Caspe after his win in the battle that took place in the town of the same name during the Third Carlist War.

A native of Catalonia, at first, he ruled in the Philippines as a Conservative but later became a Liberal. It was during his term when José Rizal, leader of the Philippine propaganda movement, was sent to Dapitan in Mindanao. He would again meet with Rizal, who was on his way to Cuba to work as a military medic before being intercepted in Barcelona, before sending him back to the Philippines where he lived the rest of his life.

References

People from Barcelona
Captains General of the Philippines
1834 births
1907 deaths
Catalan military personnel
Politicians from Catalonia
Spanish military personnel of the Third Carlist War (Governmental faction)